iMeet Central (formerly Central Desktop) is a collaboration software owned by PGi (acquisition announced in October 2014). The company's primary focus is providing a Software-as-a-Service collaboration tool to small and medium-sized businesses. The company and its products are most often compared to other wiki-based and project-centric solutions such as SharePoint and Basecamp. As of November 2013, the company serves more than 650,000 users worldwide with customers such as Gymboree, Nielsen, CBS, The Ritz-Carlton, Netflix and Harvard University.

History

The company was founded by CEO Isaac Garcia and CTO Arnulf Hsu in 2005. Prior to founding Central Desktop, Isaac and Arnulf started Upgradebase in 1997, a product data provider to the computer and consumer electronics industry, and Vendorbase in 1999, a B2B marketplace for computer resellers. Both companies were acquired by CNET Networks in 2002.

In December 2006, the company accused Google of unfairly competing against its own customers by bidding on keywords that Google held an interest in. Google responded to the accusations on its own AdWords blog.

Central Desktop received $7 million in first round funding from OpenView Venture Partners  in April 2008.

In October 2014, Central Desktop was acquired  by PGI (Premier Global Services, Inc.) and rebranded to iMeet Central in November 2015. There are no more community edition available and so users are now restricted to paid services.

Products
Central Desktop is offered in two editions - Workgroup and Enterprise.

In February 2010, the company released version 2.0 of its software, Central Desktop 2.0. New features in Central Desktop 2.0 include an online file viewer that supports more than 200 different file types, improved wiki navigation and the ability to convert any file type into a downloadable PDF document.

Central Desktop product features include:
 Wikis
 WYSIWYG editing
 Document management
 Integrated Lucene search (full text searches for Word, Excel, PowerPoint and PDF files)
 Online documents
 Online spreadsheets
 Task management
 Discussion threads
 Online file viewer
 Web conferencing
 Workflow solutions
 Microblogging

See also
 Comparison of wiki software
 List of collaborative software
 Comparison of wiki farms
 Online office suite
 Cloud collaboration
 Document collaboration
 Document-centric collaboration

References

External links
 Central Desktop official website

Groupware
Internet Protocol based network software
Networking software companies